Vega is an island in Vega Municipality in Nordland county, Norway. The  island is the largest island in the 6,500 islands in the Vegaøyan archipelago, all of which is a UNESCO World Heritage Site. The islands of Igerøya and Ylvingen lie between Vega and the mainland. The main villages on the island are Gladstad, the administrative centre of the municipality, and Holand.

The rest of the island rather flat and marshy.

The island is only accessible by boat.  There is a regular ferry route from the island to the island of Ylvingen and to the mainland.  The island of Vega is connected to the neighboring island of Igerøya by a short bridge.  There is also a ferry from Igerøya to the village of Tjøtta which is just south of the town of Sandnessjøen.

Media gallery

See also
List of islands of Norway

References

Vega, Norway
Islands of Nordland